Condorhuachana (possibly from Quechua kuntur condor, wacha birth, to give birth, -na a suffix, 'where the condor is born') is a  mountain in the Urubamba mountain range in the Andes of Peru. It is located in the Cusco Region, Calca Province, Calca District, north of the Vilcanota River. Condorhuachana is situated northeast of  Huamanchoque, southeast of Sirihuani and Sahuasiray, and southwest of Ccerayoc.

See also 
 Kuntur Wachana (film)
 Pucaorjo

References

Mountains of Peru
Mountains of Cusco Region